Voi Airport is an airport in Voi, Kenya.

Location
Voi Airport  is located in Taita-Taveta County, in the town of Voi, in southeastern Kenya, close to the International border with the Republic of Tanzania. The airport lies just beyond the western edge of Tsavo East National Park.

The geographic coordinates of this airport are:3° 21' 44.00"S, 38° 31' 54.00"E (Latitude:-3.362221; Longitude:38.531667).

Overview
Voi Airport is a small airport that serves the town of Voi and the adjacent Tsavo East National Park.

Airlines and destinations
At the moment there are no regular, scheduled airline services to Voi Airport.

See also
 Kenya Civil Aviation Authority
 List of airports in Kenya

References

External links
  Location of Voi Airport At Google Maps
  Website of Kenya Airports Authority
  Airkenya Flight Routes
 

Airports in Kenya
Coast Province
Taita-Taveta County
Tsavo National Park